Yerrinbool is a Northern Village of the Southern Highlands of New South Wales, Australia, in the Wingecarribee Shire, and is accessible from the Hume Highway (via Bargo or Alpine) and is about a  drive from nearby Mittagong. It is on the western edge of the Upper Nepean Nature Reserve, a vast area of forest, lakes and dams between Yerrinbool and the coastal communities around Wollongong (accessible by a circuitous  by road). Yerrinbool was previously officially known as the Town of Yerrinbool. It is located on the historic Old Hume Highway.

Facilities 

Yerrinbool railway station is served by the NSW TrainLink Southern Highlands Line.

The Yerrinbool General Store, across the road from the station, closed in 2014. Community facilities include a community hall, fire station, an Anzac memorial, sporting field and skate park. Located on the northern outskirts of the town, is the Tennessee Orchard, the main crop being apples, and where local fresh produce can be purchased in season.

Yerrinbool's sporting field is home-ground for the joint Yerrinbool-Bargo soccer team; the Yerrinbool-Bargo Bushrangers. The Bushrangers are part of the Highlands Soccer Association and field a team in the Highlands Competition.

The village is home to the Yerrinbool Bahá’í Centre of Learning, a Haziratu'l-Quds of the Bahá’í Faith, which includes a library, assembly hall, class rooms, meeting rooms, dining hall and a number of small accommodation buildings for use by people using the facilities for Bahá’í studies, for meetings by other organizations, or as a pilgrims' hostel. See Baháʼí Faith in Australia.

Attractions 

Yerrinbool is distinguished on the Hume Highway as the town which has the "Welcome to the Southern Highlands" sign as it is the first town of the Southern Highlands on the Hume Highway coming from Sydney.

Yerrinbool can also be distinguished by the Tennessee Orchard Sign which has a large round red apple on it. The bright sign can be seen when traveling past the village on the Hume Highway.

History 

The name Yerrinbool is an Aboriginal word for the Wood Duck — a species which is quite common around the ponds in Yerrinbool. The area where Yerrinbool was prior to settlement was known as "Little Forest".

On 13 July 1919, Yerrinbool railway station along with now closed Aylmerton Station was officially open for use on the Main South Line. It was built on the new train line that was built between Mittagong and Picton to replace what is known today as the disused Picton Loop Railway Line. This line was built to ease steep grades as the original line left Picton Station train traffic "bottlenecked".

With the line and station now operating, the village was laid out, with two early land sales of Yerrinbool Station Estate on 6 October 1919  and 1 January 1920.

Yerrinbool Post Office opened on 1 December 1919 on the arrival of the railway and closed in 1977.
The Yerrinbool General Store was built and opened in 1921 along with a saw-mill which has now been demolished. 
On 20 August 1922, a school was opened with 30 students enrolled. However, the school building was burnt down in a fire in the 1970s and not rebuilt. 
The community hall was built in March 1938 by local voluntary labour.

The Yerrinbool Baháʼí School was first opened in May 1937 as a Baháʼí Summer School, providing a reading room and retreat for practitioners of the Baháʼí Faith. It is known as the Yerrinbool Baháʼí Centre of Learning.

Population
According to the census in 1954, Yerrinbool had 50 dwellings with a population of 150.

Heritage listings 
Yerrinbool has a number of heritage-listed sites, including:

 Avon Dam Road or fire trails: Nepean Dam (reservoir)

References

External links

 History of the Northern Towns; Yerrinbool

Towns of the Southern Highlands (New South Wales)
Hume Highway
Wingecarribee Shire